Jump Super Stars is a 2D crossover fighting game for the Nintendo DS, based on Weekly Shōnen Jump characters. It was developed by Ganbarion and published by Nintendo. The game was released on August 8, 2005, in Japan and accompanied the release of a red Nintendo DS. A sequel, Jump Ultimate Stars, was released in Japan on November 23, 2006.

Gameplay
Jump Super Stars features characters from the Japanese manga magazine Weekly Shōnen Jump. The game supports 2-4 players in multiplayer and features over 75 missions.

Koma (panel) is the term for the characters that the player can use in the game. Each koma uses from 1 to 7 squares of the koma deck at the bottom screen of the Nintendo DS. The deck has 20 squares (4 x 5) for the player to place their koma.

There are three types of koma: help koma, support koma and battle koma.
 Help koma are only one square large. They'll boost up or help players in the game, but they will not appear on Battle Screen.
 Support koma are two to three squares large. These koma will show up briefly on the battle screen to help the player, generally by attacking, blocking, restoring health, or some other move.
 Battle koma are four to seven squares large, and these koma fight throughout each round. These koma represents the characters that the player controls in the battle screen, and the player can switch between characters by tapping their koma in the koma deck like a tag battle.

The player can build and store up to ten koma decks, and each deck must have at least one help koma, one support koma and one battle koma to be valid for use in battle. There are also a set of predefined decks that the player can use, but the player cannot change or delete those. It is also possible to exchange decks between friends, but they won't be able to edit the decks.

Ally boosting is done by placing koma next to each other in the deck maker. If the koma placed next to each other are "compatible", their attributes will go up. Battle characters can get a longer health bar, or increase the maximum number of special attack gauges.

Represented series
This is a list of represented series in Jump Super Stars. Most of the main characters from each series appear as characters within the games. There are 27 series in total.
 

Black Cat
4 characters (1 Battle, 2 Support, 1 Help)
Eve is a selectable character.
Train Heartnet and Sven Vollfied are support characters.

Bleach
6 characters (1 Battle, 1 Support, 4 Help)
Ichigo Kurosaki is a selectable character.
Rukia Kuchiki is a support character.

Bobobo-bo Bo-bobo
11 characters (2 Battle, 2 Support, 7 Help)
Bobobo-bo Bo-bobo and Don Patch are selectable characters.
Jelly Jiggler and Gasser are support characters.

Buso Renkin
3 characters (1 Battle, 0 Support, 2 Help)
Kazuki Muto is a selectable character.

Death Note
3 characters (0 Battle, 2 Support, 1 Help)
Light Yagami and L are support characters.

D.Gray-man
3 characters (1 Battle, 0 Support, 2 Help)
Allen Walker is a selectable character.
 
Dragon Ball
15 characters (5 Battle, 1 Support, 9 Help)
Goku, Vegeta, Gohan, Piccolo and Gotenks are selectable characters.
Krillin is a support character.

Dr. Slump
3 characters (2 Battle, 0 Support, 1 Help)
Arale Norimaki and Dr. Mashirito are selectable characters.
 
Eyeshield 21
7 characters (0 Battle, 3 Support, 4 Help)
Sena Kobayakawa, Yoichi Hiruma and Ryokan Kurita are support characters.

Gin Tama
8 characters (1 Battle, 2 Support, 5 Help)
Gintoki Sakata is a selectable character.
Shinpachi Shimura and Kagura are support characters.

Hunter × Hunter
6 characters (1 Battle, 2 Support, 3 Help)
Gon Freecss is a selectable character.
Killua Zoldyck and Kurapika are support characters.

Hikaru no Go
1 character (0 Battle, 1 Support, 0 Help)
Hikaru Shindo (paired with Sai Fujiwara) is a support character.

JoJo's Bizarre Adventure
2 characters (2 Battle, 0 Support, 0 Help)
Jotaro Kujo (with Star Platinum) and Dio Brando (with The World) are selectable characters.

Kochira Katsushika-ku Kameari Kōen-mae Hashutsujo
7 characters (1 Battle, 3 Support, 3 Help)
Kankichi Ryotsu is a selectable character.
Daijiro Ohara, Keiichi Nakagawa and Reiko Katherine Akimoto are support characters. 

Mr. Fullswing
4 characters (0 Battle, 1 Support, 3 Help)
Amakuni Saruno is a support character.

Naruto
12 characters (4 Battle, 4 Support, 4 Help)
Naruto Uzumaki, Sasuke Uchiha, Sakura Haruno and Kakashi Hatake are selectable characters.
Shikamaru Nara, Rock Lee, Neji Hyuga and Hinata Hyuga are support characters.

One Piece
8 characters (5 Battle, 2 Support, 1 Help)
Monkey D. Luffy, Roronoa Zoro, Nami, Sanji and Nico Robin are selectable characters.
Usopp and Tony Tony Chopper are support characters.

Pyu to Fuku! Jaguar
6 characters (1 Battle, 2 Support, 3 Help)
Junichi Jaguar is a selectable character.
Piyohiko and Hammer are support characters.
 
Reborn!
4 characters (1 Battle, 1 Support, 2 Help)
Tsuna Sawada (paired with Reborn) is a selectable character.
Lambo is a support character.

Rurouni Kenshin
4 characters (1 Battle, 2 Support, 1 Help)
Himura Kenshin is a selectable character.
Sagara Sanosuke and Saitō Hajime are support characters.

Shaman King
7 characters (2 Battle, 1 Support, 4 Help)
Yoh Asakura and Anna Kyoyama are selectable characters.
Hao Asakura is a support character.
 
Slam Dunk
4 characters (0 Battle, 2 Support, 2 Help)
Hanamichi Sakuragi and Kaede Rukawa are support characters.

Steel Ball Run
2 characters (0 Battle, 1 Support, 1 Help)
Gyro Zeppeli is a support character.

Strawberry 100%
7 character (0 Battle, 4 Support, 3 Help)
Aya Toujou, Tsukasa Nishino, Satsuki Kitaoji and Yui Minamito are support characters.

The Prince of Tennis
9 character (0 Battle, 6 Support, 3 Help)
Ryoma Echizen, Kunimitsu Tezuka, Shusuke Fuji, Eiji Kikumaru (with Shuichiro Oishi), Takeshi Momoshiro and Kaoru Kaido are support characters.

Yu-Gi-Oh!
6 character (1 Battle, 0 Support, 5 Help)
Yugi Mutou is a selectable character.
 
Yu Yu Hakusho
4 character (1 Battle, 2 Support, 1 Help)
Yusuke Urameshi is a selectable character.
Kurama and Hiei are support characters.

Release
Video game company Tommo had exclusive distribution rights to sell Jump Super Stars (and Jump Ultimate Stars) in North America through retailers such as Best Buy and Fry's Electronics. Many small business received minimal stock of these games.

Reception
Metacritic gave it 80/100 based on 10 reviews.

Sales
On its first week of availability, Jump Superstars sold 220,912 copies. It was the 19th best-selling game of 2005 in Japan, selling 464,076 copies.

References

External links
Nintendo's official website 
Ganbarion's official website 

2005 video games
Bleach (manga) video games
Crossover fighting games
Dragon Ball games
Ganbarion games
Japan-exclusive video games
JoJo's Bizarre Adventure games
Multiplayer and single-player video games
Naruto video games
Nintendo DS games
Nintendo DS-only games
Nintendo franchises
Nintendo games
One Piece games
Platform fighters
Shaman King video games
Shueisha franchises
Video games based on anime and manga
Video games developed in Japan
Weekly Shōnen Jump (video game series)
Yu-Gi-Oh! video games
YuYu Hakusho games